Byomkesh Pawrbo (English:Byomkesh Episode) is a 2016 Indian Bengali language thriller film directed by Arindam Sil and the film is the sequel to 2015 film Har Har Byomkesh. Produced jointly under the banner of Shree Venkatesh Films and Surinder Films, the film reprises cinematography and music by Soumik Haldar and Bickram Ghosh respectively. Sayantika Banerjee as Gulab Bai (cameo) is doing a special dance number for a particular scene which is being choreographed by Saroj Khan. The film stars Abir Chatterjee, Ritwick Chakraborty and Sohini Sarkar in lead roles. The movie is based on the story Amriter Mrityu by Saradindu Bandyopadhyay. The film was released on 16 December 2016 to positive critical reception.

Plot

Byomkesh and Ajit have been approached by Mr. Bagchi (Arindam Sil) to investigate the whereabouts of arms which were left by the U.S. soldiers after the 2nd World War. They go to the Dooars, and get rocked by the murder of a young man, Amrito followed by the explosion of Sadananda Sur's house, killing him in the process. What follows are shocking truths of Sadananda, which is connected with the arms smuggling, ending in a suspense-filled chase with the villain.

Cast
Abir Chatterjee as Byomkesh Bakshi
Ritwick Chakraborty as Ajit Kumar Banerjee 
Sohini Sarkar as Satyabati
Sayantika Banerjee as Gulab Bai
Kaushik Sen as Biswanath Mullick
Rajatava Dutta as Badrinath Das
Subhashish Mukherjee as Nafor Kundu
Mir Afsar Ali
Rudranil Ghosh as Sadananda Sur
June Malia as Juthika Mullick
Ashok Singh as Jamunadas Gangaram
Sumanta Mukherjee as Sukhomoy Samanta
 Koushik Kar as Dinesh Boral
Mrinal Mukherjee
Supriyo Dutta
Padmanabha Dasgupta

Soundtrack

Critical reception
The Times of India gave the film four stars out of five.

References

External links 

 

Indian detective films
Bengali-language Indian films
2010s Bengali-language films
Films directed by Arindam Sil
2016 films
Byomkesh Bakshi films
Indian crime thriller films
Films set in the British Raj
Films scored by Bickram Ghosh
2016 crime thriller films
Films based on works by Saradindu Bandopadhyay